Ardeshir Zahedi, GCVO (16 October 1928 – 18 November 2021) was an Iranian politician and diplomat who served as the country's foreign minister from 1966 to 1971, and its ambassador to the United States and the United Kingdom during the 1960s and 1970s.

Early life
Born in Tehran on 16 October 1928, he was the son of General Fazlollah Zahedi, who served as prime minister after participating in the CIA-led coup which led to the fall of Mohammed Mossadegh, and wife Khadijeh Pirnia.

Zahedi received a degree in agriculture from Utah State University in 1950, where he was a member of Kappa Sigma. Seven years later, he married the daughter of the Shah of Iran, Princess Shahnaz Pahlavi; the marriage ended in divorce in 1964.

Political life

Zahedi served as ambassador to the United States from 1960 to 1962 and to the United Kingdom from 1962 to 1966. He served as minister of foreign affairs from 1966 to 1971 in the cabinet of Prime Minister Amir Abbas Hoveida.

Zahedi again became ambassador to the United States from 1973 until the Iranian Revolution climaxed in January 1979. During his second stint in Washington, he won a reputation for extravagance. In the mid-1970s, Zahedi became known as a companion of the American actress Elizabeth Taylor. During the 1977 Hanafi Siege of a federal building in Washington, Zahedi and two other ambassadors from Muslim nations were able to talk the hostage-takers into surrendering and releasing 149 hostages.
 
Over the course of 1978, it was reported in some circles that Zahedi urged the Shah to appease the rioters by making scapegoats of several high-ranking officials, including Amir Abbas Hoveida (then Prime Minister) and SAVAK director Nematollah Nassiri. When the Shah left Iran in 1979, Zahedi was still serving as ambassador in Washington, but resigned as soon as Khomeini came to power. He started fervent attempts at securing political asylum for the ailing Shah and the Imperial family in Panama, Mexico, Morocco and finally Egypt. He was present at the Shah's death bed and funeral in Cairo in 1980.

Later years
Zahedi lived in retirement in Montreux, Switzerland. He received honorary doctoral degrees of law and humanities from Utah State University, East Texas State University, Kent State University, St. Louis University, University of Texas, Montana State University, Washington College, Westminster College, Harvard University, Chung-Ang University of Seoul, and the College of Political and Social Science of Lima in Peru. In December 1976, in a ceremony held in Washington D.C., Zahedi was awarded the Kappa Sigma Fraternity 'Man of the Year' Award. In 2002, he was inducted into the Alumni Hall of Honor of the Utah State University College of Agriculture. He received many awards and honors from nations around the globe for his humanitarian service and record in international affairs.

He died peacefully at his residence in Montreux, Switzerland; from COVID-19 and pneumonia on 18 November 2021, aged 93.

Zahedi's archives is held in the collection of the Hoover Institution.

Views
In an interview in May 2006, Zahedi voiced his support for Iran's Nuclear Program stating it as an "inalienable right of Iran", under the Nuclear Non-Proliferation Treaty (NPT). He told Voice of America that the U.S. approved the start of Iran's $50 billion nuclear program in the 1970s. Two documents in particular, dated 22 April 1975 and 20 April 1976, show that the United States and Iran held negotiations on a nuclear program and the U.S. was willing to help Iran by setting up uranium enrichment and fuel reprocessing facilities.

Honours

National honours 
  Order of the Crown, 1st Class (Imperial State of Iran)
  Order of Humayoun, 1st Class (Imperial State of Iran)

Foreign honours 
  Honorary Knight Grand Cross of the Royal Victorian Order (GCVO) of the United Kingdom
 Order of Merit of the Federal Republic of West Germany (27 May 1967)
 Most Exalted Order of the White Elephant of Thailand (22 January 1968)
  Honorary Grand Commander of the Most Esteemed Order of Loyalty to the Crown of Malaysia (SSM) of Malaysia (1968)
 Order of the Sacred Treasure of Japan (1969)
 Grand Cross of the Royal Order of Vasa of Sweden (1971)
 Mexican Order of the Aztec Eagle of Mexico (1975)
 Sovereign Military Hospitaller Order of Saint John of Jerusalem, of Rhodes and of Malta (24 February 2016)

References

Further reading
 Ardeshir Zahedi, The Memoirs of Ardeshir Zahedi: Volume One [English Language], (ِIbex Publishers). .
 Ardeshir Zahedi, The Memoirs of Ardeshir Zahedi: Volume Two [English Language], (ِIbex Publishers). .
 Ardeshir Zahedi (اردشیر زاهدی), The Memoirs of Ardeshir Zahedi: Volume One [Persian Language] (Khaterat-e Ardeshir Zahedi -خاطرات اردشیر زاهدی), (ِIbex Publishers). .
 Ardeshir Zahedi (اردشیر زاهدی), The Memoirs of Ardeshir Zahedi: Volume Two [Persian Language] (Khaterat-e Ardeshir Zahedi -خاطرات اردشیر زاهدی), (ِIbex Publishers). .
 'Alí Rizā Awsatí (عليرضا اوسطى), Iran in the past three centuries (Irān dar Se Qarn-e Goz̲ashteh - ايران در سه قرن گذشته), Volumes 1 and 2 (Paktāb Publishing - انتشارات پاکتاب, Tehran, Iran, 2003).  (Vol. 1),  (Vol. 2).
 Fereydoun Hoveyda, The Fall of the Shah, translated by Roger Liddell (Wyndham Books, New York, 1980). , .

External links

Register of the Ardashir Zahidi papers

1928 births
2021 deaths
Deaths from the COVID-19 pandemic in Switzerland
Politicians from Tehran
Rastakhiz Party politicians
Utah State University alumni
Government ministers of Iran
Ambassadors of Iran to the United States
Ambassadors of Iran to the United Kingdom
Iranian emigrants to Switzerland
Honorary Knights Grand Cross of the Royal Victorian Order
Knights Commander of the Order of Merit of the Federal Republic of Germany
Children of national leaders
Foreign ministers of Iran
Honorary Grand Commanders of the Order of Loyalty to the Crown of Malaysia